Zainuddin Makhdoom may refer to:

Zainuddin Makhdoom I, Jurist
Zainuddin Makhdoom II, Author

See also
 Makhdoom, a Yemeni family was settled in Kerala.